The NCAA men's volleyball tournament, officially titled the NCAA National Collegiate Men's Volleyball Championship, is an annual competition that determines the National Collegiate Athletic Association (NCAA) championship in American college men's volleyball. It had been the only NCAA championship in the sport from 1970 until 2012, when the NCAA launched a Division III championship.

Unlike most NCAA sports, men's volleyball uses a modified version of the National Collegiate championship format, which means Division I and Division II teams compete against each other in the same tournament.

In the past, schools from the Pacific Coast region have dominated this sport, in particular UCLA with coach Al Scates leading the program to 19 NCAA titles (more than any other coach).

Competition structure

Before the 2011–12 school year (2012 championship), men's volleyball did not have an official divisional structure; even now, that structure is truncated. The National Collegiate Championship remains as the NCAA's top-level championship, but Division III members now have their own championship event.

With the introduction of an official Division III championship, schools in that division are no longer eligible for the National Collegiate Championship. The last exception was Rutgers–Newark, whose men's volleyball program had been a grandfathered scholarship program, and could compete for the National Collegiate Championship through 2014. Rutgers–Newark completed a transition to Division III men's volleyball at the end of that season, and joined the D-III Continental Volleyball Conference effective with the 2015 season.

There are three general regions for men's volleyball: "West", "Midwest", and "East". As of the current 2023 NCAA men's volleyball season, five "major conferences", defined here as leagues that include full members of Division I, represent these regions. The three "traditional" major conferences are the Mountain Pacific Sports Federation (MPSF), Midwestern Intercollegiate Volleyball Association (MIVA), and Eastern Intercollegiate Volleyball Association (EIVA). In the 2018 season, the ranks of "major" conferences expanded to include the Big West Conference, the first Division I all-sports conference ever to sponsor men's volleyball. The Northeast Conference (NEC) became the second D-I all-sports conference to sponsor men's volleyball in the 2023 season. As of that season, two Division II conferences sponsor men's volleyball at the National Collegiate level. Conference Carolinas (CC) was the first NCAA conference ever to sponsor men's volleyball as a scholarship sport, having launched its men's volleyball league in the 2012 season. The 2021 season was to have been the first for the Southern Intercollegiate Athletic Conference (SIAC), with six men's volleyball members, but the conference chose not to compete in that season due to COVID-19 issues. CC has had an automatic berth in the National Collegiate championship since the 2014 season, and the Big West received an automatic berth upon the creation of its men's volleyball league. The SIAC will not be eligible for an automatic berth until the 2024 season, and the NEC until 2025 (assuming that at least six inaugural men's volleyball members of each league continue to play in their respective conferences). Members of the National Association of Intercollegiate Athletics (NAIA), a separate athletics governing body whose members are primarily smaller institutions, regularly play matches against NCAA teams.

Because of the historic lack of an official divisional structure in men's volleyball, four of the five major conferences have members that normally compete in Division II. Before the creation of the Division III national championship, the EIVA had several Division III members, but all of those schools now compete in D-III men's volleyball. The Big West became the first men's volleyball conference to consist entirely of D-I members in the 2021 season; this immediately followed UC San Diego, previously a Big West affiliate in men's volleyball (as well as women's water polo), starting its transition to Division I and fully joining the Big West. The NEC initially announced that it would launch its men's volleyball league in the 2023 season with five full D-I members and transitional D-I member Merrimack, but later announced that it would add Daemen and D'Youville, D-II members that had previously played as National Collegiate independents, as associate members effective with its first season in 2023.

Through the 2013 tournament, each of the three major conferences of that day (MPSF, MIVA and EIVA) received an automatic bid to the Final Four, with one additional at-large bid.  The remaining bid was an at-large bid that could be awarded to any team in Division I or II (including Rutgers–Newark). Generally, the best team not receiving an automatic bid (usually from one of the three major conferences) received the at-large bid.

Beginning with the 2014 championship, the field expanded to six teams, with the two new teams being the champion of Conference Carolinas and one extra at-large entry. The new format featured two quarterfinal matches involving the four lowest-seeded teams in the field, with the winners joining the two top seeds in the semifinals. Originally, the quarterfinals were to be played at campus sites, with the Final Four at a separate predetermined site, but it was decided instead to have the entire championship tournament at one site.

With the Big West Conference adding men's volleyball for the 2018 season and qualifying for an automatic tournament berth, the championship now involves seven teams. The bottom two tournament seeds contest a "play-in" match; from that point, the tournament format is identical to the one used from 2014 to 2017.

Division I participation

The 2023 men's volleyball season features 29 Division I schools, up from 26 in 2022, which had been the sport's highest D-I participation level since 1985. All three of the newest D-I programs are transitioning from D-II to D-I. Merrimack added a new team, and Lindenwood and Queens (NC), which already sponsored the sport, started transitions from D-II to D-I in July 2022. From 1986 to 2021, the number of Division I schools sponsoring men's volleyball fluctuated between 20 and 24 teams. No traditional D-I conferences sponsored men's volleyball until the Big West Conference added the sport for the 2018 season. The Big West became the first NCAA men's volleyball league to consist entirely of D-I members when UC San Diego, which was one of the six charter members of Big West men's volleyball, began a transition to D-I upon joining the Big West full-time in July 2020. Of the other four major conferences, the only all-sports league is the Northeast Conference (NEC), which started men's volleyball play in the 2023 season with six full conference members and two D-II members as single-sport associates. The Eastern Intercollegiate Volleyball Association (EIVA) and Midwestern Intercollegiate Volleyball Association (MIVA) are volleyball-specific conferences, while the Mountain Pacific Sports Federation (MPSF) is a multi-sport conference of schools whose primary conferences do not sponsor its ten sports. In addition to the 29 D-I schools, 31 Division II schools are competing in D-I volleyball during the 2023 season:
 Charleston (WV) competes in the EIVA.
 Lewis, McKendree, and Quincy compete in the MIVA.
 Concordia–Irvine has been an MPSF men's volleyball member since the 2018 season.
 Daemen and D'Youville, which had previously competed as men's volleyball independents, became single-sport NEC members for the conference's first men's volleyball season in 2023.
 Conference Carolinas, the first all-sports conference in either Division I or II to sponsor men's volleyball, currently has 8 competing teams.
 The Southern Intercollegiate Athletic Conference was to start men's volleyball competition in 2021 with 6 newly launched teams, making those schools the first historically black institutions to sponsor varsity men's volleyball. The SIAC chose not to compete in 2021 due to COVID-19 concerns, delaying the launch of men's volleyball to the 2022 season. During the 2021–22 offseason, the SIAC men's volleyball roster lost one of its intended 6 members when Paine left the NCAA, but kept its membership at 6 with the addition of men's volleyball by incoming SIAC member Edward Waters.
 Eleven D-II schools compete as men's volleyball independents. Three of these are campuses of the University of Puerto Rico. Of the remaining independents, only Coker and Limestone had sponsored the sport before the 2016 season. The others are Alderson Broaddus (2016), Lincoln Memorial (2017), Tusculum (2020), American International, Maryville (MO) (both 2022), and Missouri S&T (2023).

Two schools, one each in Division I and Division II, launched National Collegiate men's volleyball programs for the 2023 season.
 Transitional D-I member Merrimack is one of eight inaugural members of the NEC men's volleyball league.
 Missouri S&T, a full member of the D-II Great Lakes Valley Conference, is competing as an independent for the time being. In the 2021–22 school year, the GLVC had five men's volleyball schools; the launch of the S&T program maintained the conference's level of men's volleyball sponsorship after Lindenwood's July 2022 departure for the Ohio Valley Conference (which sponsors volleyball only for women).

Five additional schools, all either current Division II members or transitioning to D-II, will add National Collegiate programs in the near future:
 Full D-II members Roberts Wesleyan and St. Thomas Aquinas will add programs in the 2024 season.
 Thomas More, an NAIA men's volleyball school which started a transition to D-II in 2022–23, will fully align with the NCAA for the 2024 season.
 Full D-II member Rockhurst will add men's volleyball in the 2025 season.
 Menlo, also an NAIA men's volleyball school, is planing to start a transition from the NAIA to D-II in 2023–24 and fully align with the NCAA for the 2025 season.

Division II does not have a separate national championship, and neither Division I nor II has a sufficient number of teams to sponsor a national championship without the other.

Champions

†Vacated due to NCAA violations

Team titles

All-time record
Source: 

as of end of 2022 tournament

 indicates schools belong to Division II,  indicates schools belong to Division III. (Men's championship is for both Division I and II.)
 indicates a school that no longer exists, but whose athletic program still exists.
 indicates a school that no longer sponsors men's volleyball.
School indicates they have won at least one championship.
Other bold indicates most in respective column.

Result by school and by year 
30 teams have appeared in the NCAA tournament in at least one year starting with 1970, when the tournament shifted to its current bracket format. The results for all years are shown in this table below.

The code in each cell represents how far the team made it in the respective tournament:
  National Champion
  National Runner-up
  Semifinals (1970-2018, 2022-; 3rd place represents , 1970-1995)
  Final Four  (2019, 2021)
  Quarterfinals (2014-2016, 2018, 2019, 2021)
  First round (2018, 2019, 2021)
  Opening round (2017, 2022-; second opening round represents  2022-)

Past tournaments
Historically, California-based universities have dominated the men's volleyball national championship; Loyola Chicago, Penn State, Ohio State, BYU, and Hawaii are the only non-California universities to have won the National Collegiate championship; Lewis also won the championship tournament, but had their victory vacated due to NCAA rules violations. Only seven non-California universities have participated in the National Collegiate championship match (Loyola, BYU, Penn State, Ohio State, IPFW, Hawaii, and Lewis), although other universities such as Princeton and Ball State have participated in the final four. Only five finals have involved two non-California schools: the 2003 final, when Lewis defeated BYU but had its win vacated; the 2015 final, in which Loyola defeated Lewis; the 2016 and 2017 finals, when Ohio State defeated BYU; and the 2021 final, when Hawaii defeated BYU.

Hawaii, UCLA, Southern California, Penn State, Stanford, and Long Beach State are the only schools in Division I to have won an NCAA national championship in both men and women's volleyball. In addition, Stanford (1996–97) and Penn State (2007–08) are the only universities whose men and women's volleyball programs won the national championship in the same academic year.

2011
 May 5, 2011 – UC Santa Barbara def. Southern California, 29–27, 24–26, 25–15, 25–18; Ohio State def. Penn St., 25–18, 24–26, 25–22, 25-23
 May 7, 2011 – Ohio State def. UC Santa Barbara, 20–25, 25–20, 25–19, 22–25, 15-9

2012
 April 29, 2012 – Selections
 May 3, 2012 – Semifinals (6 p.m./8 p.m. PT) at Galen Center, Los Angeles, California: #1 seed UC Irvine defeated #4 seed Penn State 3-1 (18-25, 25–18, 25–15, 25–19); #2 seed Southern California defeated #3 seed Lewis 3-1 (25-18, 25–12, 18–25, 27–25)
 May 5, 2012 – Championship (7 p.m. PT) at Galen Center, Los Angeles, California: UC Irvine defeated Southern California 3-0 (25-22, 34–32, 26–24); 9,612 attended (record)

2013
 April 28, 2013 – Selections
 May 2, 2013 – Semifinals (6 p.m./8 p.m. PT) at Pauley Pavilion, Los Angeles, NCAA.com: No. 2-seed UC Irvine defeated No. 3-seed Loyola-Chicago 3–0; No. 1-seed BYU defeated No. 4-seed Penn State 3–0
 May 4, 2013 – National Championship (6 p.m. PT) at Pauley Pavilion, Los Angeles, ESPNU: UC Irvine defeated BYU 3-0 ( 25–23, 25–22, 26–24)
 May 4, 2013 – Game Notes: UC Irvine head coach David Kniffin became just the second coach in NCAA men's volleyball history to win a national title in his first season; 6,295 attended the title game
 May 4, 2013 – All-Tournament Team: Connor Hughes, who had 11 kills in the title game for UC Irvine (Most Outstanding Player); Chris Austin, UC Irvine; Michael Brinkley, UC Irvine Collin Mehring, UC Irvine; Kevin Tillie, UC Irvine; Ben Patch, BYU; Taylor Sander, BYU

2014
The semifinals and finals 2014 tournament were held in the Gentile Arena in Chicago on the campus of Loyola University Chicago. Two quarterfinal "play-in" matches were held at the Gentile Arena two days prior to the national semifinals, as the 2014 tournament expanded to six teams for the first time ever. A second at-large was added to the field, and the champions of the newly eligible Conference Carolinas men's volleyball division got an automatic qualification. The six teams were seeded according to the same methods used to seed the teams in previous tournaments, with the top two seeds receiving byes into the Final Four, and the third seed facing the sixth seed and the fourth seed facing the fifth seed in the quarterfinals.
Apr. 29: Quarterfinals (#3 vs. #6 seed; #4 vs. #5 seed)
May 1: Semifinals (#1 vs. #4-#5 winner; #2 vs. #3-#6 winner)
May 3: NCAA Championship

2015
The semifinals and finals of the 2015 tournament were held in the Maples Pavilion on the campus of Stanford University. Two quarterfinal "play-in" matches were held at the Maples Pavilion two days prior to the national semifinals. The six teams were seeded according to the same methods used to seed the four teams in previous tournaments; the top two seeds received byes into the Final Four, while the third seed faced the sixth seed and the fourth seed faced the fifth seed in the quarterfinals.
May 5: Quarterfinals (#3 vs. #6 seed; #4 vs. #5 seed)
May 7: Semifinals (#1 vs. #4-#5 winner; #2 vs. #3-#6 winner)
May 9: NCAA Championship

2016

2017

2018

2019

2021

2022

Broadcasters

 Expected announcer, subject to change.

See also
NCAA Division III men's volleyball tournament
NAIA Men's Volleyball Championship
NCAA Women's Volleyball Championship
List of NCAA men's volleyball programs
Pre-NCAA Intercollegiate Volleyball Champions

Notes

 
USA